Wyszowatka  (Vyshovatka) is a village in the administrative district of Gmina Krempna, within Jasło County, Podkarpackie Voivodeship, in south-eastern Poland, close to the border with Slovakia.

References

Wyszowatka